Amon Rex Natala (died January 2011) was a Zambian politician. He served as Member of the National Assembly for Bweengwa from 1978 until 1988.

Biography
Natala was elected to the National Assembly in the 1978 after former Bweengwa MP Harry Nkumbula was deselected by the United National Independence Party (UNIP), then the sole legal party in the country. He was re-elected in 1983 general elections, before being replaced as the UNIP candidate by Eli Mwanang'onze for the 1988 general elections.

Away from politics, Natala was a farmer and chair of the organising committee of the Lwiindi Gonde ceremony. He was a cousin of politician Anderson Mazoka.

References

United National Independence Party politicians
Members of the National Assembly of Zambia
Zambian farmers
2011 deaths